Anna Funder (born 1966) is an Australian author. She is the author of Stasiland and All That I Am and the novella The Girl With the Dogs.

Life
Funder went to primary school in Melbourne and Paris; she attended Star of the Sea College and graduated as Dux in 1983. She studied at the University of Melbourne and the Freie Universität of Berlin, and holds a BA (Hons) and LLB (Hons). She also has an MA from the University of Melbourne and a Doctor of Creative Arts from the University of Technology Sydney. Funder worked for the Australian Government as an international lawyer in human rights, constitutional law and treaty negotiation, before turning to writing full-time in the late 1990s.

Anna Funder's writing has received numerous accolades and awards. Her essays, feature articles and columns have appeared in numerous publications, such as The Guardian, The Sunday Times, The Sydney Morning Herald, Best Australian Essays and The Monthly. She has toured as a public speaker, and is a former DAAD (Berlin), Australia Council for the Arts, NSW Writing and Rockefeller Foundation Fellow.

In 2011 she was appointed to the Literature Board of the Australia Council.

Funder speaks French and German fluently. She lived with her husband and three children in Brooklyn, New York, returning to Australia after three and a half years.

Stasiland
Funder's Stasiland tells stories of people who resisted the communist dictatorship of East Germany, and of people who worked for its secret police, the Stasi.  Stasiland has been published in twenty countries and translated into seventeen languages; it is on school and university reading lists around the world.

Stasiland won the 2004 Samuel Johnson Prize and was also the finalist for the Age Book of the Year Awards, Guardian First Book Award, Queensland Premier's Literary Award, Adelaide Festival Awards for Literature (Innovation in Writing), Index Freedom of Expression Awards and the W.H. Heinemann Award.

All That I Am
 
Funder's 2012 novel All That I Am tells the previously untold story of four German-Jewish anti-Hitler activists forced to flee to London. There, they continued the dangerous and illegal work of smuggling documents out of Goering's office, and giving them to Winston Churchill (a backbencher at the time) to try to alert the world to Hitler's plans for war. In 1935 two of them were found dead from poison in mysterious circumstances in a locked room in Bloomsbury.The book was called "Superb" by The Spectator, "strong and impressively humane" by the Times Literary Supplement), "a beautiful ensemble novel of Graham Green’esque proportions" by Weekendavisen and "an essential novel" by Colum McCann.

All That I Am has been published in twenty countries and spent over one and a half years on the bestseller list, appearing several times at number one. The novel was BBC Book of the Week and Book at Bedtime in the UK, and The Times (London) Book of the Month for May 2012.

 All That I Am won the following awards:
 Miles Franklin Prize 2012
Western Australian Premier's Book Awards — 2011 Fiction Award and People's Choice Award 
Barbara Jefferis Award
The Indie Book Awards Indie Book of the Year
The Indie Book Awards Best Debut Fiction
Australian Book Industry Award (ABIA) Literary Fiction Book of the Year 2012
Nielsen BookData Bookseller's Choice Award.

It was a finalist for the:
IMPAC Award
Commonwealth Book Prize
The Prime Minister's Literary Award
ALS Gold Medal
Adelaide Festival Awards for Literature — Fiction Prize
Victorian Premier's Literary Award
Australian Society of Authors Asher Literary Award.

Human rights activities
Anna Funder trained as an international and human rights lawyer, interests which she continues to pursue in her professional and public life as a writer. She frequently speaks in public on issues ranging from free speech and privacy to the rights of both citizens and non-citizens (refugees). Her main interests are in balancing the rights and freedoms of individuals with our collective responsibilities to each other, the transparency of both government and corporations, and the role of courage and compassion in civil society.

Funder is an Ambassador for the Norwegian-based International Cities of Refuge Network (ICORN). ICORN is a global network of cities offering safe havens for persecuted writers. She is a member of the Advisory Panel of the Australian Privacy Foundation.

Funder is a board member of the University of Melbourne Foundation, and an Honorary Fellow of the University of Technology Sydney.

Funder is a member of the Folio Prize Academy and PEN International, both its Australian and US chapters. In 2007 she was chosen to deliver a PEN 3 Writers Lecture.

Public appearances and named lectures
Funder's essays, articles and columns have appeared in many publications, including The Guardian,  The Sydney Morning Herald, and Ny Tid, and have been selected for Best Australian Essays.  Her feature "Secret History", which appeared in The Guardian and in Good Weekend, about the files from the Nazi death camps held in obscurity by German authorities, won the 2007 ASA Maunder Award for Journalism.

Funder has delivered numerous named lectures, including the:
Allen Missen Address for Liberty Victoria
PEN Three Writers Lecture
The closing address for the Perth Writers Festival 2013
Dymphna Clark Memorial Lecture 2013
ICORN Oration 2013.

Awards and honours
Full list of awards:
DAAD Fellowship
Samuel Johnson Prize, 2004
ASA Maunder Prize, 2007
Rockefeller Foundation Fellowship, 2008
Australia Council Fellowship
NSW Writing Fellow, 2010
In 2011 she was named one of the Sydney Morning Heralds '100 People of Influence' in Australia
West Australian Premier's Prize, 2011
West Australian Premier's People's Choice Award, 2011
BBC Book of the Week and Book at Bedtime in the UK, 2011
The Miles Franklin Prize, 2012
Australian Book Industry Award (ABIA) Book of the Year, 2012
ABIA Literary Fiction Book of the Year, 2012
Nielsen BookData Bookseller's Choice Award, 2012
Barbara Jefferis Award, 2012
The Indie Book of the Year, 2012
The Indie Best Debut Fiction, 2012
The Times (London) Book of the Month for May 2012
In 2012 she was appointed to the Literature Board of the Australia Council 
Anna was the winner of InStyle Magazine's Woman of Style Award for Arts & Culture 2013Full list of nominations:'
The Age Book of the Year Awards
The Guardian First Book Award
Queensland Premier's Literary Award
Adelaide Festival Awards for Literature (Innovation in Writing)
Index Freedom of Expression Awards
W.H. Heinemann Award
IMPAC Award
Commonwealth Book Prize
The Prime Minister's Literary Award
ALS Gold Medal
Adelaide Festival Fiction Prize
Victorian Premiers Literary Award
The Australian Society of Authors Asher Literary Award

Bibliography

References

Notes
"Stasiland by Anna Funder", Guardian Unlimited, Thursday 6 November 2003.
"Debut author wins Johnson prize", BBC News, Tuesday, 15 June 2004
 ABC Critical Mass biography: Anna Funder ABC Critical Mass, 2003
 Life Behind the Wall Now and Then Lancette Journal, review by Alidë Kohlhaas April 2004

External links

Miles Franklin Literary Award - Website - (2012 Winner)
Video: Anna Funder lecture on 'Courage' Sydney PEN 3 Voices Project, November 2008, on SlowTV
Podcast of Anna Funder discussing "On East Germany" at the Shanghai International Literary Festival

1966 births
Living people
Australian non-fiction writers
Miles Franklin Award winners
Writers from Melbourne
21st-century Australian novelists
21st-century Australian women
Australian women novelists
University of Melbourne alumni
People educated at Star of the Sea College, Melbourne
University of Technology Sydney alumni
Free University of Berlin alumni